Golconda No. 1 Precinct is located in Pope County, Illinois, USA.  As of the 2000 census, its population was 708.

Geography

References

Precincts in Pope County, Illinois